House is a 1986 American comedy horror film directed by Steve Miner, with a screenplay by Ethan Wiley, from an original story written by Fred Dekker. Produced by Sean S. Cunningham, the movie is the first installment in the House film series, and stars William Katt, George Wendt, Richard Moll, and Kay Lenz. The plot tells the story of a troubled author who lives in his deceased aunt's house and soon falls victim to the house being haunted. It collected $22.1 million worldwide, and was followed by three sequels.

Plot
Author Roger Cobb is a troubled man: he and his wife have separated, their only son Jimmy has disappeared without a trace,
and his aunt has committed suicide by hanging. On top of everything else, he has been pressured by his publisher to write another book. To the chagrin of his fans and publisher, Roger plans a novel based on his experiences in the Vietnam War, instead of another horror story, as a way to purge himself of the horrors that he had experienced while there.

After his aunt's funeral, Roger decides to live inside her house to write instead of selling it, as recommended by the estate attorney. After moving in, Roger begins to have powerful graphic nightmares, including thoughts about his comrade, Big Ben, who died in Vietnam. In addition, strange phenomena spring forth from the house, haunting him in his waking hours. He tries communicating his fears to his next-door neighbor Harold Gorton who only thinks that Roger is crazy.

One night while investigating a noise coming from his late aunt's bedroom, Roger is attacked by a deformed monster inside the closet. Soon, more attacks occur: levitating garden tools attack him, his wife appears and transforms into a hideous hag-like creature to attack him (whom he believes he kills), and gremlin creatures attempt to kidnap a neighbor's child whom Roger is reluctantly babysitting. Eventually, the author discovers an entry into a sinister other-world through the bathroom medicine cabinet and is pulled into the darkness, where he fortuitously locates his lost son Jimmy.

Roger manages to escape with Jimmy but is soon confronted by an undead Big Ben who wants revenge on him; Ben was taken prisoner and tortured before dying, and he blames Roger for failing to kill him before he could be captured by the enemy. Roger confronts Ben, no longer afraid of his fears, and destroys him with a grenade as he and his son escape the burning house. In the end, he triumphantly glances back at the house while regaining control of his life and reunites with his wife and child.

Cast
 William Katt as Roger Cobb
 George Wendt as Harold Gorton
 Richard Moll as Big Ben
 Kay Lenz as Sandy Sinclair
 Mary Stävin as Tanya
 Michael Ensign as Chet Parker
 Susan French as Aunt Elizabeth Hooper
 Erik Silver and Mark Silver as Jimmy
 Peter Pitofsky as Sandywitch
 Felix Silla as Little Critter
 Elizabeth Barrington as Little Critter
 Jerry Maren as Little Critter
 Dino Andrade as Little Critter (Critter Voices)
 Mindy Sterling as Woman in Bookstore
 Alan Autry as Police Officer
 Steven Williams as Police Officer

Production
House began filming on April 22, 1985. The first two weeks of production comprised shooting exteriors at the estate known today as Mills View, a Victorian style home first built in 1887 and located on Melrose Avenue in Monrovia, California. At the time, the building was owned by two Los Angeles firemen, brothers Brian and John Wade.

Production designer Gregg Fonseca and a crew of five spent about four weeks modifying the existing Victorian manor that included repainting the whole of the exterior, bordering the front yard with a wrought iron fence supported by stone pillars, and attaching foam spires to the roof. The back of the house had its clapboard façade covered with brick, and landscapers were brought in to plant flowers and reseed the dying lawn. The yard had no sidewalk at the time, so a faux walkway - made from plywood painted gray to look like concrete, and positioned to lead straight to the front porch - was added as a finishing touch. This sidewalk was pivotal in the finished film. Some time after production, a true concrete walkway was then installed in the same spot, capturing the evil nature of the one in the film.

The final six weeks of production moved operations to Ren-Mar Studios in Hollywood, where two floors of the interior of the Monrovia house were recreated on sound stages. This included sets for the living room, staircase, den and three upstairs bedrooms. On a separate adjacent set, the jungle exteriors for the Vietnam flash-back scenes were also built on sound stages, taking three days to put together.

A total of seven monsters were designed and fabricated for the production. These creatures – which included the obese witch, the zombified corpse of Big Ben, three demonic kids, the flying skull-faced monster in the void, the plaque mounted marlin that comes to life and the war demon from the closet – were constructed by seventeen special effects artists, over a period of three-and-a-half months. The war demon, in particular, was an elaborately built puppet, measuring eighteen feet, fully mechanized, operated by fifteen people and featured a fully working lower bowel system.

Release
House opened in 1,440 theaters on February 28, 1986 and grossed $5.9 million in its opening weekend, missing first place to Pretty in Pink. By the end of its run, House grossed $22.1 million worldwide, of which $19.4 million was from the North American box office.

Reception
On review aggregation website Rotten Tomatoes the film has an approval rating of 62% based on reviews from 13 critics.

Janet Maslin of the New York Times wrote: "Scares are not its strong suit, but it has a trim, bright look and better performances than might be expected."
Variety wrote, "Though much of this nonsense is played tongue-in-cheek, an audience can hardly be expected to swallow the screenplay’s arbitrary approach to Cobb's character."
Ryan Pollard at Starburst wrote at the time of the Blu-ray release: "As a film, House is still as much of a warm, at times bonkers, family-friendly horror as it's ever been."  Alex Stewart of White Dwarf wrote that although the film has a good premise, it is "squandered on yet another tired old haunted house story" whose supernatural horrors can not compare to the real life trauma of war.

In 1987, Richard Moll and Kay Lenz were both nominated for Saturn Awards. Director Steve Miner won a Critics' Award for his work on the film and was nominated for an International Fantasy Film Award.

Soundtrack
The soundtrack for House was released on vinyl, cassette tape and CD in 1987. The soundtrack runs approximately 51:14 and has 25 songs that were featured in House and House II: The Second Story.

Sequels
House successfully launched a film series, with: House II: The Second Story in 1987, House III: The Horror Show in 1989, and House IV: The Repossession in 1992. Each film was met with mixed critical and financial reception.

See also
 List of ghost films

References

External links
 
 
 

1986 films
1986 horror films
1980s comedy horror films
1980s ghost films
American haunted house films
American zombie films
1980s English-language films
Films scored by Harry Manfredini
Films about dysfunctional families
Films about writers
Films directed by Steve Miner
Films shot in Los Angeles County, California
New World Pictures films
Vietnam War films
Films with screenplays by Ethan Wiley
1986 comedy films
American films about revenge
1980s American films
House (film series)